General Juan N. Álvarez National Park is a national park and protected area located in Guerrero, Mexico. The area is named after Juan Álvarez, a Mexican general and former president of Mexico.

References

National parks of Mexico
Protected areas of Guerrero